Didier Courtois (born 3 August 1967) is a former ice dancer who represented France. With partner Corinne Paliard, he is the 1986 World Junior bronze medalist and 1988 French national champion. They placed 10th at the 1988 European Championships and 14th at the 1988 Winter Olympics.

Competitive highlights 
(with Paliard)

References 

1967 births
Living people
French male ice dancers
Olympic figure skaters of France
Figure skaters at the 1988 Winter Olympics